A testament is a document that the author has sworn to be true. In law it usually means last will and testament.

Testament or The Testament can also refer to:

Books
 Testament (comic book), a 2005 comic book
 Testament, a thriller novel by David Morrell 1975
 Testament, a novel by Nino Ricci 2002
 :fr:Le Testament (Maupassant) 1882
 Le Testament (also, Le Grand Testament), a collection of poems by medieval French author François Villon 1461
 Lenin's Testament, the name given to a document written by Vladimir Lenin 1922-3
 Old Testament, the large, first section of the holy scriptures of Christianity, incorporating the Jewish Scriptures (the Tanakh)
 New Testament, the smaller, final section of the holy scriptures of Christianity including the Gospels, epistles of Paul, and other writings
 Book of Mormon: Another Testament of Jesus Christ, the additional and alternate scriptures of Mormonism, translated from Reformed Egyptian
Testament: the Bible and History, a book by John Romer
 Testament phonographe (Phonograph Testament), poetry book by Léo Ferré, 1980
 The Testament (Grisham novel), 1999
 The Testament (Lustbader novel), a novel by Eric Van Lustbader, completing a novel by Robert Ludlum
 The Testament (Wiesel novel), 1981
 The Testaments (2019), Margaret Atwood's sequel to The Handmaid's Tale (1985)

Films and television
 Testament, a 1975 Yugoslav film directed by Milos 'Misa' Radivojevic
 Testament (1983 film), a 1983 American film about the aftermath of a nuclear war on a family
 Testament, a 1988 a Ghana / UK film by John Akomfrah
 Testament, a 1988 television series based on John Romer's book
 Testament: The Bible in Animation, a 1996 animated series featuring animated versions of stories from the Bible.
 Testament (2004 film) (Arabic Ten'ja) French-Moroccan film by Hassan Legzouli with Roschdy Zem and Aure Atika
 The Testament (Testamentet), a 2011 Danish documentary that won the documentary prize at the 65th Bodil Awards
 Testament, an upcoming television series by Angel Studios adapting the Acts of the Apostles in a modern-day setting

Games
 Testament (Guilty Gear), a character from the video game series Guilty Gear
 Testament (video game), a 1996 first-person shooter for the Amiga
 Testament (Xenosaga), characters from the Xenosaga SciFi video game series

Music

Artists and labels
 Testament (band), an American thrash metal band
 Testament Records (UK), a classical music record label
 Testament Records (USA), an American roots music record label

Albums and operas
Testament (album), by All Saints
Testament, album by Talley Trio
Testament, 2005 album by Toroidh 
The Testament (Cormega album)
The Testament (Seventh Wonder album), 2022

Classical
"Testament", a composition for chamber orchestra by Jonathan Cole
"Testament", a composition for chamber orchestra by Brett Dean
"Testament", a French art song by Henri Duparc

Songs
 "Testament" (song), a 2012 song by Matt Fishel
 "Testament", a song by Axium from the album Blindsided (2003)
 "Le Testament", a song by Léo Ferré from the album L'Été 68 (1969)

See also 
 Testimony